Uthman Beg or Osman Beg (1356 – 1435) was a late 14th and early 15th-century leader of the Turkoman tribal federation of Aq Qoyunlu in what is now eastern Turkey, Iran, Azerbaijan and Iraq.

Name 
He was born Baha-ud-Din Osman and was later given the nickname Qara Iluk or Qara Yuluk meaning The Black Leech. However, John E. Woods argues that this interpretation is doubtful since "leech" in modern Turkish is sülük, not yülük, which means cleanshaven or smooth.

Early life 
Uthman Beg was the son of Fakhr-ud-Din Qutlugh, likely by his Greek wife, Maria, sister of Alexios III of Trebizond. He is estimated to have been born  1356. According to Byzantine and Aq Qoyunlu sources, he later married his maternal cousin, a daughter of Alexios III and his consort Theodora Kantakouzene. 

He was afraid of the intentions of his brothers, Ahmed and Pir Ali when they joined Kadi Burhan al-Din of Sivas. He eventually killed his opponents and took over their territories in 1398 but retreated from Erzinjan on the arrival of the Ottomans under Süleyman Çelebi.

Reign 
When Timur invaded the Caucasus and eastern Anatolia, the Aq Qoyunlu sided with him in support and fought alongside the Timurids against the Ottomans. For his services, Uthman Beg was given Diyarbakır in 1402. After this expedition, he tried to consolidate his dominance in Southeastern and Eastern Anatolia. In 1407, further increased his reputation by defeating Mamluks emirs. However, he failed against Qara Yusuf, who conquered Azerbaijan by defeating Timur's grandson Abu Bakr. In 1412, he was defeated by Qara Yusuf near Ergani. When he was defeated by Qara Yusuf again in 1417, he made a peace agreement with Qara Yusuf, which lasted one year. In 1418, he besieged and pillaged Mardin causing Qara Yusuf to march on him again. He was defeated and fled to Aleppo. Two years later, he besieged Erzincan and defeated Yakub, son of Qara Yusuf. In 1421, he tried to take Mardin again but was defeated by Qara Iskandar. He further expanded his territory by talking Urfa and Erzincan. He divided his land by giving Bayburt to his nephew Qutlu Beg, Tercan to his other nephew and Şebinkarahisar to his son Yaqub. He also took Harput from the Dulkadirids, which he gave to his son Ali Beg. In 1429, Mamluks plundered Urfa and its surrounding, and even captured one of Uthman's sons, Hâbil Beg, who died in Cairo in 1430. The same year Mamluk Sultan Barsbay marched on Amid, however Mamluks did not achieve a significant success. In 1432, he conquered Mardin. In 1434, upon Qara Iskandar's plunder of Shirvan, Khalilullah I asked help from Uthman Beg. He besieged and took Erzurum from the Qara Qoyunlu and gave the city to his son Sheikh Hasan. In August 1435, he was defeated by Qara Iskandar in the vicinity of Erzurum, and died soon after.

References

Sources
 

Aq Qoyunlu rulers
1356 births
1435 deaths
15th-century monarchs in the Middle East
14th-century monarchs in the Middle East